The Merry Widow is a 1934 film adaptation of the 1905 operetta of the same name by Franz Lehár. The film was directed and produced by Ernst Lubitsch starring Maurice Chevalier and Jeanette MacDonald with a supporting cast featuring Edward Everett Horton, Una Merkel, Sterling Holloway, Donald Meek, Jason Robards Sr. and Akim Tamiroff. A French-language version was produced at the same time and released in France the same year as La Veuve joyeuse with some but not all of the same cast (Chevalier, MacDonald, and Tamiroff appear in both versions). Lorenz Hart and Gus Kahn wrote new English lyrics for some Lehar songs under the musical direction of Herbert Stothart.

Plot
Playboy Captain Danilo (Maurice Chevalier) is ordered by King Achmet of Marshovia (George Barbier) to court and marry Madame Sonia (Jeanette MacDonald), a rich widow who owns a large portion of the kingdom.

Cast

English
 Maurice Chevalier as Captain Danilo
 Jeanette MacDonald as Madame Sonia / Fifi
 Edward Everett Horton as Ambassador Popoff
 Una Merkel as Queen Dolores
 George Barbier as King Achmet
 Minna Gombell as Marcelle
 Ruth Channing as Lulu
 Sterling Holloway as Mischka
 Donald Meek as Valet
 Herman Bing as Zizipoff
 Jason Robards Sr. as Arresting Officer (uncredited) 
 Akim Tamiroff as Maxim's Manager (uncredited)

French
 Maurice Chevalier as Prince Danilo
 Jeanette MacDonald as Missia
 Marcel Vallée as L'ambassadeur
 Danièle Parola as La reine
 André Berley as Le roi
 Fifi D'Orsay as Marcelle
 Pauline Garon as Lola
 George Davis as L'ordonnance
 Jean Perry as Le valet
 Akim Tamiroff as Turk

Awards and honors
Cedric Gibbons and Fredric Hope won the Academy Award for Best Art Direction.

The film was nominated for the American Film Institute's 2006 list AFI's Greatest Movie Musicals.

Reception
The film earned $861,000 in the US and $1,747,000 overseas for a total rental of $2,608,000.  It earned a further $151,000 on re-release in 1949–1950 to almost break even.

References
Notes

External links 

 
 
 
 
 
 

Films directed by Ernst Lubitsch
1934 films
1934 musical comedy films
1934 romantic comedy films
American black-and-white films
Films produced by Irving Thalberg
Films whose art director won the Best Art Direction Academy Award
Metro-Goldwyn-Mayer films
Operetta films
Films based on operettas
American romantic musical films
American multilingual films
Sound film remakes of silent films
American musical comedy films
Films set in Europe
Films set in the 1880s
Films set in a fictional country
1930s romantic musical films
1934 multilingual films
1930s American films